Trimethylsulfonium (systematically named trimethylsulfanium) is an organic cation with the chemical formula  (also written as ).

Compounds

Several salts of trimethylsulfonium are known. X-ray crystallography reveals that the ion has trigonal pyramidal molecular geometry at sulfur atom, with C-S-C angles near 102° and C-S bond distance of 177 picometers. Unless the counteranion is colored, all trimethylsulfonium salts are white or colorless.

Preparation
Sulfonium compounds can be synthesised by treating a suitable alkyl halide with a thioether. For example, the reaction of dimethyl sulfide with iodomethane yields trimethylsulfonium iodide:

Related
An extra oxygen atom can bond to the sulfur atom to yield the trimethylsulfoxonium ion , where the sulfur atom is tetravalent and tetracoordinated.

Use
Glyphosate herbicide is often supplied as a trimethylsulfonium salt.
When mixed with aluminium bromide, or aluminium chloride or even hydrogen bromide, trimethylsulfonium bromide forms an ionic liquid, which melts at temperatures below standard conditions.

References

See also
 Onium compounds

Cations
Sulfur ions